Blacksville may refer to some places in the United States:
Blacksville, Georgia
Blacksville, West Virginia